John Roberts (born 22 December 1953) is a retired British rower who competed at the 1980 Summer Olympics. Roberts was part of the coxless pair  with Jim Clark that won a silver medal at the 1977 World Rowing Championships in Amsterdam. At the 1980 Olympic Games he was selected by Great Britain to row in the men's coxed four, the crew finished in seventh place.

References

External links
 

1953 births
Living people
British male rowers
Olympic rowers of Great Britain
Rowers at the 1980 Summer Olympics
Place of birth missing (living people)
World Rowing Championships medalists for Great Britain